Diocese of Bathurst may refer to:

Catholic Church 
 Roman Catholic Diocese of Bathurst (Australia), in New South Wales, Australia
 Roman Catholic Diocese of Bathurst (Canada), in New Brunswick, Canada

Anglican Communion 
 Anglican Diocese of Bathurst, in New Brunswick, Canada

See also 
 Bathurst (disambiguation)